Irina Lyalina, (born February 3, 1968) is an Uzbekistani sprint canoer who competed in the mid-1990s. At the 1996 Summer Olympics in Atlanta, she was eliminated in the repechages of the K-1 500 m event and the semifinals of the K-4 500 m event.

External links
Sports-Reference.com profile

1968 births
Canoeists at the 1996 Summer Olympics
Living people
Olympic canoeists of Uzbekistan
Uzbekistani female canoeists
Asian Games medalists in canoeing
Canoeists at the 1994 Asian Games
Canoeists at the 1998 Asian Games
Medalists at the 1994 Asian Games
Medalists at the 1998 Asian Games
Asian Games silver medalists for Uzbekistan
20th-century Uzbekistani women